Luffia rebeli is a moth of the Psychidae family. It is found on the Canary Islands.

The wingspan is 8–12 mm. The forewings are shining pale stone-grey, mottled with greyish fuscous. The hindwings are pale mouse-grey.

The larvae feed on lichen.

References

Moths described in 1908
Psychidae